"Cut Here" is a song by English rock band The Cure, released as a single in October 2001 from their best-of compilation Greatest Hits released the same year.

Content 

Cure frontman Robert Smith wrote the song in memory of his friend Billy Mackenzie, the lead singer of the new wave band Associates, who committed suicide in 1997.  The title of the song does not relate directly to the lyrical content; it is an anagram of "The Cure".

Regarding its musical style, AllMusic wrote that the song "rises with early sounds of Madchester".

Release 

The track was released as a single from the band's 2001 Greatest Hits compilation, reaching number 54 on the UK Singles Chart. It is the band's last release for record label Fiction.

The song was re-recorded later in 2001 for the band's Acoustic Hits release, which contains eighteen re-recordings of previous songs by the band using acoustic guitars and was only released as a limited edition bonus disc to said greatest hits album.

Track listing

"Cut Here"
"Signal to Noise"
"Cut Here (Missing Remix)"

Versions & Remixes
 Cut Here 4:10
 Cut Here (Missing Mix) 5:37
 Cut Here (Acoustic Re-Recording) 4:14
 Cut Here (Instrumental Demo 1997) 4:32
Note: The demo was originally called B46 V.3.

Personnel

Robert Smith –  vocals, guitar, 6-string bass, keyboards
Simon Gallup – bass guitar
Perry Bamonte – guitar
Roger O'Donnell – keyboards
Jason Cooper – drums

References

External links
 

The Cure songs
2001 singles
Songs written by Robert Smith (musician)
Fiction Records singles
2001 songs
Songs written by Perry Bamonte
Songs written by Jason Cooper
Songs written by Simon Gallup
Songs written by Roger O'Donnell